This is a list of games that were released for the PlayStation 4 console.

There are currently {{#expr: 
 + 

}} games across both lists.

A–L

M–Z

See also 
 List of best-selling PlayStation 4 video games
 List of PlayStation VR games

PlayStation 4